Hartland Community School is a K-12 school located in Hartland, New Brunswick, Canada. Hartland Community School has around 575 students. The students in Hartland Community School are from all of Carleton County. The school logo is a garnet-colored husky.

The school is part of Anglophone West School District, which includes 70 schools. 

In 2020, it launched a school-run newspaper called the Husky Howler.

See also
 List of schools in New Brunswick
 Anglophone West School District

References

Schools in Carleton County, New Brunswick
High schools in New Brunswick
Elementary schools in New Brunswick
Middle schools in New Brunswick